Austroponera castanea is an ant species in the subfamily Ponerinae. It is endemic to New Zealand.

References

 Antweb
 LandCare

External links

Ponerinae
Ants of New Zealand
Insects described in 1865
Endemic fauna of New Zealand
Taxa named by Gustav Mayr

Hymenoptera of New Zealand
Endemic insects of New Zealand